The women's 100m backstroke events at the 2020 World Para Swimming European Open Championships were held at the Penteada Olympic Pools Complex.

Medalists

Results

S2

S6
Final

S7

S8
Final

S9

S10

S12
Final

S13

S14
Heat 1

Final

References

2020 World Para Swimming European Championships